The 2020 Birmingham Legion FC season was the club's second season of existence and their second in the USL Championship, the second tier of American soccer.  This article covers the period from November 18, 2019, the day after the 2019 USL-C Playoff Final, to the conclusion of the 2020 USL-C Playoff Final, scheduled for November 12–16, 2020.

Roster

Competitions

Exhibitions

USL Championship

Standings — Group G

Match results
In the preparations for the resumption of league play following the shutdown prompted by the COVID-19 pandemic, Birmingham's schedule was announced on July 7.

USL Cup Playoffs

U.S. Open Cup 

As a USL Championship club, Birmingham will enter the competition in the Second Round, to be played April 7–9.

References

Birmingham Legion FC
Birmingham Legion
Birmingham Legion
Birmingham Legion